Robert Browne (by 1533 – 1565 or later), of Launceston, Cornwall, was an English politician.

He was a Member (MP) of the Parliament of England for Newport, Cornwall in November 1554.

References

Year of death missing
People from Launceston, Cornwall
Members of the pre-1707 English Parliament for constituencies in Cornwall
English MPs 1554–1555
Year of birth uncertain